Terra Nova is a Floating Production Storage and Offloading Vessel (FPSO) located in the Terra Nova oil and gas field, approximately  east off the coast of Newfoundland, Canada in the North Atlantic Ocean. The Terra Nova field is operated by Suncor Energy Inc., with a 37.675% interest.

The Terra Nova field is south of the successful Hibernia field and the more recent White Rose field. All three fields are in the Jeanne d'Arc Basin on the eastern edge of the famous Grand Banks fishing territory.

Terra Nova lost 165 m^3 of oil into the ocean in 2004 because of two mechanical failures.  In June 2006, production on Terra Nova was halted as the platform was sent to Rotterdam for a refit. She returned to the Terra Nova field on 25 September 2006.

External links

 Terra Nova field @ Offshore Technology

Floating production storage and offloading vessels
Service vessels of Canada
Economy of Newfoundland and Labrador
1999 ships
Petroleum industry in Canada
Oil platforms off Canada